Samuel Carey Bradshaw (June 10, 1809 – June 9, 1872) was an Opposition Party member of the U.S. House of Representatives from Pennsylvania.

Samuel Carey Bradshaw was born in Plumstead, Pennsylvania.  He attended the public schools, graduated from the University of Pennsylvania School of Medicine in 1833 and practiced in Quakertown, Pennsylvania.

Bradshaw was elected as an Opposition Party candidate to the Thirty-fourth Congress.  He was an unsuccessful candidate for reelection in 1856.  He died in Quakertown in 1872.  Interment in Friends Burial Ground.

Sources

The Political Graveyard

1809 births
1872 deaths
People from Bucks County, Pennsylvania
Opposition Party members of the United States House of Representatives from Pennsylvania
Pennsylvania lawyers
19th-century American physicians
Perelman School of Medicine at the University of Pennsylvania alumni
19th-century American politicians
19th-century American lawyers